Aguelmis Rojas de Armas also Aquelmis Rojas (born March 28, 1978) is a male long-distance runner from Cuba. He represented his native country at the 2004 Summer Olympics in Athens, Greece, where he finished in 47th place in the men's marathon event, clocking 2:21.59. Rojas set his personal best (2:14.15) in the marathon on April 18, 2004, in Havana.

A Cuban exile since March 2009, he was nationalized Uruguayan in August 2014 and is competing for Uruguay since late 2014.

Biography
He finished fourth in the men's marathon at the 2003 Pan American Games. At the 2007 IAAF World Road Running Championships, he set the Cuban record of 1:03:48 for the half marathon, although he finished in 55th place. Aside from road competitions, he occasionally runs on the track and was the winner of the gold medal over 10,000 metres at the 2005 Central American and Caribbean Championships.

Achievements

References

 
 
 Profile at athlecac.org

1978 births
Living people
Cuban male long-distance runners
Cuban male marathon runners
Athletes (track and field) at the 2003 Pan American Games
Athletes (track and field) at the 2004 Summer Olympics
Olympic athletes of Cuba
Pan American Games competitors for Cuba
Athletes (track and field) at the 2015 Pan American Games